Castle Farmhouse may refer to:

Castle Farmhouse, Raglan, Wales
Castle Farmhouse, St Georges-super-Ely, Wales
Northborough Manor House